Shermar Cuba Paul (born May 29, 1997), known professionally as Night Lovell, is a Canadian rapper, songwriter and record producer. His old record producer name was under the alias KLNV, standing for Killanov. He initially gained fame after his song Dark Light went viral in 2014. He has released three studio albums named Red Teenage Melody released on June 13, 2016, Goodnight Lovell released on February 22, 2019, and Just Say You Don't Care, released May 6, 2021. He was a featured artist on American YouTuber and musician Corpse Husband's "Hot Demon Bitches Near U ! ! !", which released on September 3, 2021.

As of 2021, Night Lovell had been streamed over 650 million times on Spotify.

Musical style 
His musical style is often categorized by its dark and atmospheric sound. He has been described as "effortlessly conjur[ing] darkness".

His songs have a brooding atmosphere, with the subject matter often revolving around themes of introspection and angst. This results in the pervasive dark tone that populates both the lyrics and instrumentation, which itself incorporates elements of drill, trap, and cloud rap, as well as ambient elements.

Discography

Studio albums

Extended plays 

 I'll Be Back (2014)

Mixtapes 

 Concept Vague (2014)

Singles

Guest appearances

References 

1997 births
Canadian male rappers
Living people
Musicians from Ottawa
21st-century Canadian rappers
21st-century Canadian male musicians